Choi Ki-Suk (born March 28, 1986) is a South Korea football player. He has previously spent his career at Ulsan Hyundai FC.

References

External links
 

1986 births
Living people
South Korean footballers
Jeju United FC players
Busan IPark players
Ulsan Hyundai FC players
K League 1 players
Korea National League players
Association football midfielders